"Groovy Grubworm" is a 1969 instrumental by American session musician Harlow Wilcox. The lead single for his album Groovy Grubworm and Other Golden Guitar Greats, the track became Wilcox's sole charting hit, peaking at #30 on the Billboard Hot 100. It also reached #1 on the RPM Country Tracks chart in Canada.

Chart performance

References

1969 singles
Harlow Wilcox (musician) songs
1969 songs
1960s instrumentals